The following is a list of mountains in Samoa.

Mountains are referred to as mauga in the Samoan language.

References

Mountains of Samoa
Samoa
Samoa